AVIAREPS Group is a General Sales Agent (GSA) of airline and tourism representative. Founded in 1994 in Germany the corporation is now operating through a network of 65 offices in 58 countries.

History 
AVIAREPS Airline Management GmbH was founded in Germany in 1994. Four years later, the AVIAREPS Airline Management GmbH transitioned into a joint stock company, named AVIAREPS AG.

The expansion to the global company AVIAREPS began in 1996 when AVIAREPS opened offices in Europe and later expanded into Russia, United States, Asia, Australia and India, Africa, Latin America and South East Asia.

Shareholdings 
AVIAREPS’ share capital reflects a nominal registered capital of 1,071,604 Euros. Thereof 1,043,440 are common shares and 28,164 are non-par preference shares without voting right. All shares are held by private people, with the exception of 25.24 percent owned by an investment company.

See also

General sales agent (airlines)

References

Fields of operation
AVIAREPS serves clients in the following sectors:
Airlines, destinations, hotels, food & wine, airports, cruise lines, shopping & attractions, cars, trains, travel products

Marketing companies
Cargo airlines of Germany